Strategic Plan Campine (Dutch:  Strategisch Plan Kempen) is a non-profit organisation located in Turnhout, Belgium. Its aim is to promote the social and economic development of the Campine region of the province of Antwerp. The organisation runs the PLATO-program for the support of Small and medium enterprises in the region and developed a strategic plan for the development of the Campine region.

History
The organisation was founded in 1988. In 2006 its name changed to Strategische Projectenorganisatie Kempen vzw or SPK vzw (E: Strategic Project Organisation Campine).

See also
 Campus Blairon
 Flemish Institute for Technological Research (VITO)
 Innotek

References

Sources
 Strategisch Plan Kempen (Dutch)
 Jos Kempen nieuwe voorzitter van SPK (Dutch)

External links
 SPK

Organisations based in Antwerp Province
Turnhout